The Institut Français (French capitalization, Institut français; "French institute") is a French public industrial and commercial organization (EPIC). Started in 1907 by the Ministry of Foreign Affairs for promoting French, francophone as well as local cultures around the world, in 2011 it replaced the CulturesFrance project as the umbrella for all French cultural outreach projects, with an expanded scope of work and increased resources (Decree No. 2010-1695 of 30 December 2010, in response to the law relating to the external scope of the State adopted on 12 July 2010).

Chaired by interim by its general director Erol Ok, who is assisted by Clément Bodeur-Cremieux, Secretary General, the French Institute works closely with the French cultural network abroad consisting of more than 150 branches and nearly 1000 branches of the Alliance française around the world. The process of incorporating the cultural networks of a dozen diplomatic missions has been conducted from January 2011 to 2014 as an experiment: Cambodia, Chile, Denmark, United Arab Emirates (UAE), Georgia, Ghana, India, Kuwait, UK, Senegal, Serbia, Singapore and Syria (suspended due to the political situation in Syria.)

The government has entrusted the Institut Français with promoting French culture abroad through artistic exchanges: performing arts, visual arts, architecture, the worldwide diffusion of French books, film, technology and ideas. Accordingly, the institute has developed a new scientific program for the dissemination of culture.

The Institut Français welcomes foreign cultural missions through the organization of "seasons" or festivals and cooperation with the countries of the south, including ensuring the management of the funds of "Fonds Sud Cinema" in partnership with the National Center of Cinematography and the moving image.

It also provides training for newly formed missions and professionalization of staff of the international French cultural network.

History of French cultural institutes and centers 

The first French institute, the Institut français de Florence, was established in 1907 in Florence by Julien Luchaire, with the help of the Faculty of Arts of Grenoble, followed by others would play an important role in the creation of deep cultural ties between France and other country.

Historically the French institutions established in the first half of the 20th century were committed to academic institutions, while the French cultural centers, usually created later in the second half of the 20th century or the beginning of the 21st century, were created by the French government. This difference does not exist anymore and cultural centers are now adopting the name of Institut Français.

Some institutions have a bi-national status, governed by a bilateral agreement between the governments, particularly in Guinea (Conakry), Guinea Bissau ( Bissau), Mozambique ( Maputo), Namibia ( Windhoek) and Niger (Jean Rouch Franco-Nigerien Cultural Centre of Niamey ).

The 143 French institutions and French cultural centers are institutions located outside France under the Ministry of Foreign Affairs and charged with promoting intellectual and cultural audiovisual cooperation between professionals, to present the French, Francophone as well as local traditional and contemporary art for all audiences (to begin with, with the young audience), to promote French higher education to foreign students and teachers and offer a complete range of courses and international examinations for the French language.

They usually have, in the embassies of France which they depend on, a financially (but not legally) autonomous status. This also gives its director the status of authorising and being accountable for the budget devoted to the establishment (which is a grant from the Ministry of Foreign Affairs and from its own resources) and a reserve fund not limited to the year, which enables the creation of multi-year programs.

They are funded fully or partially by their own revenues raised by teaching French as official language or as a foreign language (depending on the countries) and sponsorship (for those with a genuine ambition in terms of cultural engineering).

Moreover, the French research institutes abroad (IFRE) depend jointly on the Ministry of Foreign Affairs and the CNRS.

Today, French institutions and French cultural centers (RTCs) are essential levers for the development of cooperation between network professionals culture and education as well as for the promotion of cultural and linguistic diversity.

Some international French institutes

Cultural institutes

In Europe

 Institut français d'Allemagne
 Institut français d’Ankara
 Institut français d'Athènes
 Institut français de Barcelone
 Institut français de Belgrade
 Institut français de Bilbao
 Institut français de Bratislava
 Institut français de Bucarest
 Institut français de Budapest
 Institut français du Danemark
 Institut français d'Écosse (Edinburgh)
 Institut français de Finlande
 Institut français de Florence
 Institut français d’Istanbul
 Institut français d'Italie
 Institut français de Lettonie
 Institut français du Royaume-Uni (London)
 Institut français de Madrid
 Institut français de Naples
 Institut français de Milan
 Institut français de Norvège
 Institut français de Novi Sad
 Institut français de Nis
 Institut français de Palerme
 Institut français de Pologne : Cracovie et Varsovie
 Institut français du Portugal
 Institut français de Prague
 Institut français - Centre Saint-Louis (Rome)
 Institut français de Roumanie (Bucharest)
 Institut français de Saint-Pétersbourg
 Institut français de Saragosse
 Institut français de Sarajevo
 Institut français de Sofia
 Institut français de Slovénie
 Institut français de Stockholm
 Institut français de Stuttgart
 Institut français d'Estonie (Tallinn)
 Institut français des Pays-Bas
 Institut français de Grèce (Thessalonique)
 Institut français de Thessalonique
 Institut français d'Ukraine (Kyiv)
 Institut français de Valence
 Institut français de Vienne
 Institut français de Zagreb

Outside Europe
 Africa
 Instituts français en Algérie (Algeria) at Algiers, Oran, Constantine, Annaba and Tlemcen
 Instituts français au Maroc (Morocco) at Agadir, Casablanca, Fes, Marrakech, Meknes, Oujda, Rabat-Salé and Tangier 
 Institut français en Mauritanie (Mauritania) at Nouakchott
 Institut français à Maurice (Mauritius) at Beau-Bassin Rose-Hill
 Institut français Léopold Sédar Senghor (Senegal) at Dakar
 Institut français au Bénin at Cotonou
 Institut français en Côte d'Ivoire at Abidjan 
 Institut français au Gabon at Libreville 
 Institut français au Ghana at Accra 
 Institut français au Soudan at Khartoum
 Institut français au Togo at Lomé 
 Institut français en Libye at Tripoli and Benghazi
 Institut français en Tunisie at Tunis
 Institut français en Égypte at Alexandria, Cairo, and Heliopolis
 Institut français au Cap-Vert
 Institut français en République démocratique du Congo at Kinshasa
 Institut français au Congo at Brazzaville
 Institut français en Guinée équatoriale
 Institut français du Nigeria

 America
 Institut franco-chilien - Instituto chileno-francés at Providencia, Chile
 Institut français d'Amérique latine at México
 Institut français au Canada
 Institut français aux États-Unis
 Institut français en Haïti at Port-au-Prince

 Asia
 Institut français de Singapour at Singapore
 Institut français au Cambodge (Cambodia) at Battambang, Phnom Penh and Siem Reap
 Institut français en Chine (China) at Beijing (Pékin)
 Institut français en Birmanie (Myanmar) at Rangoon
 Institut français en Inde (India) at New Delhi
 antenna at Pondichéry
 Institut Français d'Indonésie (Indonesia) at Jakarta, Bandung, Surabaya, and Jogjakarta
 Institut français de Tel-Aviv (Israel) at Tel Aviv
 Institut français de Jérusalem - Romain Gary, Jérusalem
 Institut franco-japonais (Japan)
 Institut franco-japonais de Tokyo et Yokohama
 Institut franco-japonais du Kansai at Kyoto
 Institut franco-japonais du Kyushu at Fukuoka
 Mission culturelle française au Liban (Lebanon) at Beirut (Beyrouth), Tripoli, Sidon (Saïda), Deir al-Qamar, Zahlé, Jounieh, Nabatieh, Tyre (Tyr) and Baalbek (Balbecq)
 Institut français en Irak at Baghdad and Erbil
 Institut français aux Émirats arabes unis at Abu Dhabi
 Institut français en Corée du Sud at Seoul
 Institut français au Vietnam
 at L'Espace, Hoan Kiem, Hanoi
 at Ha Dong, Hanoi
 at Huế
 at Da Nang
 at Ho Chi Minh City

Research institutes IFRE 

Centre de recherche français à Jérusalem (CRFJ) - Israël
Centre français de recherche en sciences sociales (CEFRES) - Prague
Institut de recherche sur le Maghreb contemporain (IRMC) - Tunis
Institut de recherche sur l’Asie du Sud-Est contemporaine (IRASEC) - Bangkok
Institut français d'archéologie orientale (IFAO) - Le Caire (rattaché au MESR et non au MAEE)
Institut français de Pondichéry (IFP) - Pondichéry
Institut français de recherche en Afrique IFRA-Nigeria et IFRA-Nairobi
Institut Français de Recherche en Iran (IFRI) - Téhéran
Institut français du Proche-Orient (IFPO) - Damas – Beyrouth – Amman
Institut français d'Afrique du Sud (IFAS) - Johannesburg
Institut français d'études anatoliennes Georges Dumézil (IFEA) - Istanbul
Institut français d’études andines (IFEA) - Lima
Institut français d’études sur l’Asie centrale (IFEAC) - Tachkent
Maison Française d'Oxford (MFO) - Grande-Bretagne

References

International organizations based in France
Organizations established in 2011
Cultural promotion organizations
Francophonie
 
International cultural organizations
Language advocacy organizations
Language education organizations